Zak Ramsey is a fictional character on the British Channel 4 soap opera Hollyoaks, played by Kent Riley. Zak first appeared in 2004, when he was credited as 'Zak Barnes'. After only four months, Riley was dropped from the programme. The character received a revival 18 months later however when producer Bryan Kirkwood brought him back in 2006. Following the arrival of producer Paul Marquess in January 2010, the series underwent a major overhaul and as part of a large cast cull, it was announced that the character had been axed from the series for a second time on 6th August 2010, replaced by a new character, Brendan Brady.

Character creation and casting
The character of Zak was created as a new student along with Bella Manning, to move in the halls of residence at the HCC. He was originally billed as "footie-mad, a Scouser with attitude and more than an eye for the ladies!" After the character's initial stint, he was brought back into the series and later relatives of the character were introduced. During the character's first stint he was credited as Zak Barnes. At the time he re-entered the series in 2006 his surname had been changed to Ramsey due to the arrival of the separate Barnes family during the intervening period.

Auditions were already underway for the part of Zak, when actor Kent Riley received a call from his agent, he auditioned for the role, later going on to be cast as Zak. After leaving the series, Riley received a call asking him to rejoin the cast for a more permanent stint.

In early 2010, it was announced that Allan had stepped down from the position of executive producer, with Paul Marquess taking over the role. It was soon revealed that he planned to revamp Hollyoaks, changing the productions team, then began a cast cull starting with the axing of three established characters. Stephanie Waring (who plays Cindy Hutchinson) then revealed that all remaining cast members feared their characters would be next to depart from the series. One month later the cast cull continued as Marquess announced his plans to remove the further 11 characters, including Zak at the end of Riley's contract. It was stated that the character will simply move on to new pastures at the end of his storyline-arc.

Character development
Zak is portrayed as a typical 'blokey' male character who likes football and parties. He also values his close friends and family. Channel 4 publicity describes him as a fun-loving man who likes 'a good knees-up' with his good friends, they also explain how he looks after his sister's love life, as Zak is always shown on-screen being protective of his sister.

Zak has always been unlucky in his love life even though he has often been described as having an eye for the female characters. He lusted after his close friend Zoe Carpenter for over a year, he then had a brief romance with Katy Fox that came to an end abruptly. He later found love with an unlikely partner, Michaela McQueen.

Storylines
Zak first shares a student flat with Zara Morgan, Lisa Hunter, Steph Dean, Cameron Clark and Bella Manning. His story lines mainly revolve around the other students, and he later leaves the college.

After being off camera for over a year, he returns in September 2006, the student flat now occupied by Jessica Harris (Jennifer Biddall), Joe Spencer, Olivia Johnson, and new arrivals Will Hackett, Zoë Carpenter (Zoe Lister), and Kris Fisher (Gerard McCarthy). Zak drinks too much cheap vodka at the Loft and becomes sick. Ironically, this may have saved his life, since Kris, Zoë, Joe, and Olivia all go to the Dog in the Pond a few days later and are caught up in an explosion. Joe and Olivia are killed, and Zak moved into Olivia's room.

Zak has one-night stands with both Zoë and Jess. After realising his feelings for Zoë, Zak tries his best to make things up to her, but this is soon ruined by flatmate Will who wants Zoë to himself, and so sets Zak up to look as though he has stolen from her. Zak soon begins to distrust Will, and in April 2007, Zak and Zoë realise the extent of Will's madness. Zak then comes to her rescue when Will takes her hostage on the roof of the college. This results in Will being sectioned under the Mental Health Act. Zak then tries to kiss Zoë thinking this is what she wanted, but she reacts badly because of Will and goes home. When Zoë returns, Zak continues to pine for her, but soon realises she is falling for Darren Osborne. Zak has saved Darren from muggers and a guilt-ridden Darren initially stays away from Zoë, but Zak pushes them together.

In February 2008, Zak gets close to flatmate Katy Fox (Hannah Tointon), although she is dating his mate Justin Burton. After Zak and Katy had been playing around with a shopping trolley in the corridors, they share a kiss. Later, while Zak is helping Katy to study, she confesses that she is upset that Justin was giving so much attention to, what had just been revealed, his son Charlie. Later at the Loft, Zak and Katy share another passionate kiss. They become lovers, and Katy continues to lean on him for a few months, until finally in April 2008, Justin walks in on them kissing. Katy leaves town, and Zak is once again left alone. On 14 July 2008, Zak fails his degree in Sports Science and now must stay at HCC for another year to finish the course.

In the latter half of 2008, Zak drunkenly sleeps with Michaela McQueen who had been upset though both later regretted the incident, and nothing happens for months afterwards. However, on New Year's Eve 2008, they sleep together again. Calvin Valentine then arrests Zak and Ash, for supposedly beating up Gaz. However, this is untrue. Michaela goes to protest for Zak's release and the two begin a relationship when Zak is cleared. Michaela and Zak have a fight which nearly results in them splitting up until they confess, they love each other.

Zak's sister Hayley Ramsey (Kelly-Marie Stewart) arrives. She is in a wheel-chair due to Guillain–Barré syndrome. Hayley was in hospital for four months and Zak never went to see her. Zak tells him it hurt too much for him to go and he would have done anything for him to get the virus and not her. He tells he hates going because she is always laughing and smiling despite being ill and he does not know what to say to her. They sort out their differences.
 
Michaela tries to enrol Zak in the Army. Zak and Hayley's brother Caleb arrives. Zak then pretends to be attending training, later revealing he lied. Zak graduates with first class honours and decides to carry on and do a master's degree. The next day Caleb is sent to fight in Afghanistan. A year later Caleb dies in action and Zak becomes engaged to Michaela to cope with his grief. Zak has a one-night stand that splits up him and Michaela. He then finds out Caleb died because his friend Tariq Mistry was saving an Afghan boy. Zak beats up Tariq but gets back with Michaela. Racist Des Townsend uses Zak's grief to brainwash him against Calvin. Zak realizes that Des is a racist and tries to stop him from planning to attack Ravi Roy. Zak saves Ravi after Des plants a smoke bomb in Ravi's burger bar, Relish. He makes an anonymous phone call to the police for an assault to save Ravi's sister Anita Roy when he realises that Des is planning to attack her in the woods, but he actually gets Gaz Bennett to do it for him, which later leads to Gaz's arrest.

Michaela finds out about Zak's role in Des's racist attacks, and this is the final straw for the pair; causing them to split. Zak is then confronted by Tariq for his attack on him, but Zak apologises for what he has done and Tariq agrees not to report him to the police as he could see he was grieving for Caleb at the time. Realizing he has nothing in the village, Zak leaves for London with best friend Kris. Michaela soon joins him a few weeks later after she is sacked from her job. On 5 September 2011, Michaela returns and says that she and Zak have broken up and that she has been living in Ibiza for the last 6 months.

References

External links
 Character profile on the E4.com
 Character profile at Hollyoaks.com

Hollyoaks characters
Television characters introduced in 2004
Male characters in television